The Olds Grizzlys are a junior A ice hockey team in the Alberta Junior Hockey League.  They play in Olds, Alberta, Canada with home games at the Olds & District Sports Complex.

History
The Olds Grizzlys joined the Alberta Junior Hockey League (AJHL) after the Taber Golden Suns franchise relocated to Olds following the 1980–81 season. The Grizzlys were a dominant team in the AJHL in the early 1990s with three straight league championships and a Centennial Cup title as Junior A national champions, won on home ice, in 1994.

On June 30, 2017, the league announced that the franchise had been transferred to new ownership called the "Friends of the Grizzlys."

Season-by-season records
Note: GP = Games played, W = Wins, L = Losses, T/OTL = Ties/Overtime losses, SOL = Shootout losses, Pts = Points, GF = Goals for, GA = Goals against

Junior A National Championship
The National Junior A Championship, known as the Centennial Cup and formerly as the Royal Bank Cup or RBC Cup, is the postseason tournament for the Canadian national championship for Junior A hockey teams that are members of the Canadian Junior Hockey League since 1971. Since 1986, the tournament has consisted of the regional Junior A champions and a previously selected host team. Since 1990, the national championship has used a five-team tournament format when the regional qualifiers were designated as the ANAVET Cup (Western), Doyle Cup (Pacific), Dudley Hewitt Cup (Central), and Fred Page Cup (Eastern). From 2013 to 2017, the qualifiers were the Dudley Hewitt Cup (Central), Fred Page Cup (Eastern), and the Western Canada Cup champions and runners-up (Western #1 and #2).

The tournament begins with round-robin play between the five teams followed by the top four teams playing a semifinal game, with the top seed facing the fourth seed and the second facing the third. The winners of the semifinals then face each other in final game for the national championship. In some years, the losers of the semifinal games face each other for a third place game.

NHL alumni
The following former Grizzlys have gone on to play in the National Hockey League (NHL):
Darcy Campbell
Phil Crowe
Kevin Haller
Nathan Lawson
Jay Rosehill
Matthew Yeats

See also
 List of ice hockey teams in Alberta

References

External links
Olds Grizzlys website
Alberta Junior Hockey League website

Alberta Junior Hockey League teams
Ice hockey teams in Alberta
Ice hockey clubs established in 1981
1981 establishments in Alberta